is a Japanese actor, TV personality and former mixed martial artist. He is currently employed by Platinum Production. His blood type is O.

Ken Kaneko is best known for his role in the Takeshi Kitano film Kids Return (1996), in which he and Masanobu Andō portrayed a couple of high school dropouts trying to find purpose and direction in life. He was also a mixed martial artist in the Welterweight division and fought Charles Bennet in Pride FC Shockwave 2005.

Filmography

Films
Kids Return (1996)
Himitsu (1999)
Gokusen: The Movie (2009)
Strawberry Night (2013)

Television drama
Kindaichi Case Files (1996)

Television animation
Rescue Wings (2008)

Awards
1997: Japanese Academy Award – Newcomer of the Year (Kids Return)
1999: Elan d'or Award for Newcomer of the Year

Mixed martial arts record

|-
| Loss
| align=center| 0–3
| Andy Ologun
| Decision (unanimous)
| K-1 PREMIUM 2006 Dynamite!!
| 
| align=center| 3
| align=center| 5:00
| Osaka, Japan
| 
|-
| Loss
| align=center| 0–2
| Hideo Tokoro
| Submission (Armbar)
| K-1 Hero's 7
| 
| align=center| 1
| align=center| 1:50
| Yokohama, Japan
| 
|-
| Loss
| align=center| 0–1
| Charles Bennett
| Submission (Armbar)
| Pride FC Shockwave 2005
| 
| align=center| 1
| align=center| 4:14
| Saitama, Japan
| 
|-

Sources

External links

Bout Review fighter data
Sherdog fighter data

1976 births
Male actors from Tokyo
Japanese bodybuilders
Japanese male film actors
Japanese male mixed martial artists
Mixed martial artists utilizing Brazilian jiu-jitsu
Japanese practitioners of Brazilian jiu-jitsu
Japanese male television actors
20th-century Japanese male actors
21st-century Japanese male actors
Zainichi Korean people
Living people